Elisa Rosario Ruiz Penella (born 15 December 1934, in Granada), known as Elisa Montés, is a Spanish actress who took her pseudonym from the celebrated work of her grandfather, Manuel Penella, El gato montés.

Montés is the sister of actresses Emma Penella (1930–2007) and Terele Pávez (1939-2017), daughter of Magdalena Penella Silva and the law politician Ramón Ruiz Alonso, and granddaughter and great-granddaughter to composers Manuel Penella and Manuel Penella Raga. She was married to actor Antonio Ozores. The daughter of this marriage, Emma Ozores, has also dedicated herself to acting.

On October 12, 2017 she received the ASFAAN award by Alberto Dell'Acqua and Emma Ozores.

Selected filmography
 Eleven Pairs of Boots (1954)
 Noi siamo le colonne (1956)
 The Battalion in the Shadows (1957)
 Faustina (1957)
 Gibraltar (1964)
 Django the Condemned (1965)
 Samson and His Mighty Challenge (1965)
 I due toreri (1965)
 Erik, the Viking (1965)
Texas, Adios (1966)
 Return of the Seven (1966)
 Seven Dollars on the Red (1966)
 Mutiny at Fort Sharpe (1966)
 Maneater of Hydra (1967)
The Cobra (1967)
99 Women (1969)
The Girl from Rio (1969)
Captain Apache (1971)
 Ambitious (1976)

Awards 

Valladolid Festival. Best actress for La vida en un bloc (1956).
Prize of the Circle of Cinematographic Writers (1955). Best supporting actress for Últimas banderas.
Prize of the National Syndicate of the Spectacle for Abiciosa (1975).

References

External links
 
Filmography at Hoycinema (in Spanish)
Biography (in Spanish)
Entry in Dictionario del teatro at Google Books

1934 births
Living people
People from Granada
20th-century Spanish actresses
Spanish film actresses
Spanish television actresses